Hugh Charles Clifford, 7th Baron Clifford of Chudleigh (29 May 1790 – 28 February 1858) was a British peer. He inherited the title from his father on 29 April 1831.

Clifford, eldest son of Charles Clifford, 6th Baron Clifford of Chudleigh, and Eleanor Mary Arundell, daughter of Henry Arundell, 8th Baron Arundell of Wardour, was born in 1790. He was educated at the Roman Catholic college of Stonyhurst, and in 1814 attended Cardinal Consalvi to the Congress of Vienna. He served as a volunteer through a large portion of the Peninsular campaigns. On succeeding to his father's estates in 1831 he took his seat in the House of Lords. He gave his general support to the ministry of Lord Grey and afterwards of Lord Melbourne, but seldom took part in the debates except on questions connected with Roman Catholicism. In his later years he lived chiefly in Italy, where he had a house near Tivoli. He died at Rome on  28 February 1858 from an injury. 

By his wife, Mary Lucy, the only daughter of Thomas Weld of Lulworth Castle, Dorsetshire, and his wife, Lucy (née Clifford; died 1815), he left two daughters and four sons. Their eldest son, Charles Hugh, became the 8th Baron Clifford. 

Clifford was the author of a Letter to Edmund Burke on the Repeal of the Corn Laws (1824); Letters addressed to Lord Alvanley on his pamphlet, "The State of Ireland considered" (1841) and Letters to the Editor of the Morning Chronicle on the East Indian Question, as well as several published speeches.

Family and children
On 8 February 1819, he married Mary Lucy Weld; the couple had six sons and two daughters:

 Charles Hugh Clifford, 8th Baron Clifford of Chudleigh, 1819 – 1880
 Hon. Thomas Hugh Clifford, born 1822 – died 1833
 Rt. Rev. William Hugh Joseph Clifford, born 24 December 1823 – died 14 August 1893; buried at Prior Park, Clifton; 2nd Bishop of Clifton from 29 January 1857; ordained as bishop on 15 February 1857; died in office
 Sir Henry Hugh Clifford, born 1826 – died 12 April 1883, Ugbrooke. He was awarded the Victoria Cross. On 21 March 1857, he married Josephine Anstice (died 15 January 1913); the couple had three sons and five daughters:
Sir Hugh Charles Clifford, born 1866 – died 18 December 1941. On 15 April 1896, he married firstly, to Minna à Beckett (died 1907); the couple had one son and two daughters. On 24 September 1910, he married, secondly, to Elizabeth Lydia Rosabelle de la Pasture (née Bonham), of Bramling, Kent, but was known as a novelist under the pen-name "Mrs Henry de la Pasture"; she died 30 October 1945. This marriage had no issue. Sir Hugh Charles Clifford's children by his first marriage were:
Lieut. Hugh Gilbert Clifford, born 20 January 1897 – killed in action, 1 July 1916 (in World War I) 
Mary Agnes Philippa Clifford, born 2 April 1898 – died 17 April 1978. On 19 June 1920, she married Major General Sir Noel Holmes (died 24 December 1982); the couple had one son, Hugo Clifford (born 7 January 1924) and one daughter, Bettine Mary (born 22 April 1921)
Monica Elizabeth Mary Clifford, born 4 May 1903 – died 11 January 1965. She married twice, firstly, on 9 June 1925, to Major Cecil Edward Trafford (died 15 December 1948).  She married, secondly, on 10 October 1952, to Richard Désiré Girouard.  Both unions were childless. 
Brig.-Gen. Henry Frederick Hugh Clifford, born 13 August 1867 – killed in action, 11 September 1916 (in World War I) 
Everard Louis Hugh Clifford, born 2 June 1871 – died 16 December 1935 (as a monk) 
May Clifford, born 1859 – died 1861
Emily Josephine Clifford, born 23 July 1860 – died 28 December 1923.
Blanche Winifred Mary Clifford, born 3 November 1861 – died 1 October 1918 
Alice Mary Clifford, born 26 November 1862 – died 8 April 1927
Sibyl Mary Clifford, born 12 October 1864 – died 1948
Edmund Hugh Clifford, died as infant
Hon. Walter Clifford, born 1830, Rome (became a Roman Catholic priest)
Hon. Eleonora Mary Clifford, born 1820 – died 1871 as a Roman Catholic nun
Hon. Mary Constantia Clifford, died March 1898

Sources

1790 births
1858 deaths
People educated at Stonyhurst College
7